Donald Ferdinand Kellner (September 15, 1879 – April 1, 1935) was a politician from Alberta, Canada.

Kellner was elected as a Progressive/UFA candidate to the House of Commons of Canada in the 1921 Canadian federal election in the Edmonton East. He defeated Joseph Clarke and incumbent Henry Arthur Mackie in a 3-way race to serve his first term in office. 
Kellner switched to the new Athabaska district in the 1925 Canadian federal election. Kellner was defeated by former Alberta Liberal MLA Charles Cross. A year later, in the 1926 Canadian federal election running for the UFA again, he defeated Cross. Kellner was defeated by John Francis Buckley in the 1930 Canadian federal election.

External links
 

1879 births
1935 deaths
Progressive Party of Canada MPs
Members of the House of Commons of Canada from Alberta
United Farmers of Alberta MPs